Terry Childs may refer to:
 Terry Childs (network administrator)
 Terry Childs (serial killer)